Shirley Abicair in Australia is an Australian television series featuring musician Shirley Abicair which aired in 1960 on ABC. It consisted of six half-hour episodes which were shot on film. In the documentary-type series, Abicair sang songs and interviewed people. One of the episodes was about Sydney.

References

External links
Shirley Abicair in Australia on IMDb

1960 Australian television series debuts
1960 Australian television series endings
Black-and-white Australian television shows
English-language television shows
Australian Broadcasting Corporation original programming